A basis swap is an interest rate swap which involves the exchange of two floating rate financial instruments.  A basis swap functions as a floating-floating interest rate swap under which the floating rate payments are referenced to different bases.

The existence of a basis arises from demand and supply imbalances and where, for example, a basis is due for a borrower seeking dollars, this is indicative of a synthetic dollar interest rate in the FX market pricing higher than the direct dollar interest rate. The existence of the basis is a violation of the covered interest rate parity (CIP) condition.

Usage of basis swaps for hedging
Basis risk occurs for positions that have at least one paying and one receiving stream of cash flows that are driven by different factors and the correlation between those factors is less than one. Entering into a Basis Swap may offset the effect of gains or losses resulting from changes in the basis, thus reducing basis risk.

 against exposure to currency fluctuations (for example, 1 mo USD LIBOR for 1 mo GBP LIBOR)
 against one index in the favor of another (for example, 1 mo USD T-bill for 1 mo USD LIBOR)
 different points on a yield curve (for example, 1 mo USD LIBOR for 6 mo USD LIBOR)

Basis swaps in energy commodities
In energy markets, a basis swap is a swap on the price differential for a product and a major index product (e.g. Brent Crude or Henry Hub gas).

See also
Interest rate swap
Basis trading

References

Swaps (finance)
Derivatives (finance)